Firestone station is an elevated light rail station on the A Line of the Los Angeles Metro Rail system. The station is located between Graham Avenue and the Union Pacific freight railroad's Wilmington Subdivision (the historic route of the Pacific Electric Railway), and elevated over the intersection of Firestone Boulevard, after which the station is named, in the unincorporated Los Angeles County community of Firestone Park.

Service

Station layout

Hours and frequency

Connections 
, the following connections are available:
Los Angeles Metro Bus: 
the Link: Florence-Firestone/Walnut Park

Notable places nearby 
The station is within walking distance of the following notable places:
 Colonel Leon H. Washington County Park

References

External links
 Metro website

A Line (Los Angeles Metro) stations
Railway stations in the United States opened in 1990
1990 establishments in California
Pacific Electric stations